Mount Florence is a mountain, in the Tuolumne Meadows region of Yosemite National Park. Its easiest route is a  scramble. Mount Florence is the tenth highest mountain in Yosemite. Deep in the Yosemite backcountry, Mount Florence is not often climbed, though on the trip, one passes through spectacular scenery, on all approaches.

The mountain's name
August 23, 1864, Florence Hutchings, "Floy" as she was nicknamed, was the first white child, born in Yosemite Valley. She was also nicknamed the "Yosemite Tomboy," and lived a non-comformist life, riding horses, was scornful of disapproval, did not fear peril, and swore. She had a zest for life, and died young, in 1881, at the age of 17. She knew John Muir, who named Mount Florence for her.

She was religious and worked as a caretaker of the Yosemite Valley Chapel.

Near to Mount Florence
All of the following are close to Mount Florence:

References

External links and references
 Notes on Mount Florence
 Some photos
 A gravestone note on Florence Hutchings

Mountains of Yosemite National Park
Mountains of Madera County, California